Mystery Bay State Park is an  Washington marine state park on Mystery Bay, a small inlet off Scow Bay/Kilisut Harbor on the western side of Marrowstone Island. The park is located approximately one-half mile north of the Nordland General Store (which also faces Mystery Bay) on Flagler Road (SR 116). Many older wooden sailboats can be swinging at permanent moorage at the park. Park activities include picnicking, shellfish harvesting, fishing, boating, beachcombing, and scuba diving.

References

External links
Mystery Bay Marine State Park Washington State Parks and Recreation Commission 
Mystery Bay Marine State Park Map Washington State Parks and Recreation Commission

Parks in Jefferson County, Washington
State parks of Washington (state)
Protected areas established in 1972